Shirin Bolagh (also Romanized as Shīrīn Bolāgh; also known as Shāh Bolāghī and Shāhbulāq) is a village in Rezaqoli-ye Qeshlaq Rural District, in the Central District of Nir County, Ardabil Province, Iran. At the 2006 census, its population was 57, in 13 families.

References 

Towns and villages in Nir County